The Palermo Rail Ring is a railway line under construction in Sicily, Italy. It is expected to open in 2021 or 2022 and will extend from Palermo Notarbartolo railway station to Giachery station.

History
The two main aims of the project are to improve commuter traffic in and around Palermo and also to reduce urban congestion in the city. Another objective is to improve the sustainable mobility of the area. During the construction period, about 750 new jobs are expected to be created.

Route
The eventual planned route is to be an underground circular single track railway with a length of about 6.5 km, and is due for completion in 2018.

Stations
New underground stations on the line are as follows:

 Libertà
 Porto
 Politeama 
 Malaspina

Future
The long term plan for the railway is for the ring to be extended south to Termini Imerese, and a railway bypass will be built at Palermo Centrale. Rail transport services on this section that connects Palermo Centrale to the Airport, will take place every 15 minutes compared to the present frequency of 30 minutes.

See also
 Palermo metropolitan railway service

References

Transport in Palermo
Underground commuter rail